The North Regional League was a football competition in Northern England. The League was formed in 1958 as a reserve league for Football League teams in the North of England. After being formed with 19 members, and reaching a maximum of 22 teams in its second season, numbers quickly began to decline, and by the final season, 1968–69, only four teams competed.

While the membership consisted mainly of reserve teams, a few first teams were admitted in at attempt to boost numbers, two of these (Gateshead and South Shields) were among those teams that lifted the championship.

Champions

References

External links
North Regional League
1958/59 North Regional League

 
Defunct football leagues in England